The Book of the Dead is a novel by Douglas Preston and Lincoln Child published on July 1, 2007 by Warner Books. This is the seventh book in the Special Agent Pendergast series. Also, it is the third and final installment to the trilogy concentrating on Pendergast and his relationship with Lieutenant Vincent D'Agosta in their pursuit to stop Pendergast's brother, Diogenes.

Preston and Child call these books the Diogenes trilogy. The three books in the trilogy start with Brimstone in 2004 and continue with Dance of Death in 2005.  This final book was released on May 30, 2006 and has been on the New York Times Best Seller list, reaching as high as #4 on the list.

Synopsis
An FBI agent, rotting away in a high-security prison for a murder he did not commit...
His brilliant, psychotic brother, about to perpetrate a horrific crime...
A young woman with an extraordinary past, on the edge of a violent breakdown...
An ancient Egyptian tomb with an enigmatic curse, about to be unveiled at a celebrity-studded New York gala...

Connections to other works by Preston and Child
Near the beginning of the book, Nora Kelly studies yellow micaceous Anasazi potsherds and begins to plan an expedition to find their source. This references Thunderhead.
Readers will find echoes of Relic and Dance of Death in the premise of another big museum exhibit gone wrong.

Sequel
Though this novel ends the trilogy, Agent Pendergast and his ward, Constance Greene, appear next in the novel The Wheel of Darkness which picks up very shortly following the events depicted here.

References

External links
Official website
Review on The Thunder Child
This Just In...News from the Agony Column

American thriller novels

2006 American novels
Novels by Douglas Preston
Novels by Lincoln Child
Collaborative novels
Sequel novels
Techno-thriller novels